The 1923–24 season was Newport County's fourth season in the Football League, third consecutive season in the Third Division South and fourth season overall in the third tier.

Season review

Results summary

Results by round

Fixtures and results

Third Division South

FA Cup

Welsh Cup

League table

P = Matches played; W = Matches won; D = Matches drawn; L = Matches lost; F = Goals for; A = Goals against; GA = Goal average; Pts = Points

External links
 Newport County 1923-1924 : Results
 Newport County football club match record: 1924
 Welsh Cup 1923/24

1923-24
English football clubs 1923–24 season
1923–24 in Welsh football